Willie Callaghan (born 23 March 1967) is a Scottish former professional association football player, who played for Dunfermline Athletic, Walsall, Cowdenbeath, Clyde, Albion Rovers, Montrose, Meadowbank Thistle, Livingston and Partick Thistle in the Scottish and English leagues. He also played for Scottish Highland Football League Club, Inverness Thistle, and for three Scottish Junior Clubs respectively, Halbeath, Kelty Hearts and Glenafton Athletic.

Family history 
Willie's father, also named Willie, was a footballer who played for Dunfermline and Scotland in the 1960s and 1970s. His son, Liam Callaghan, had a trial spell with Birmingham City in November 2011. His uncle, Tommy Callaghan, played for Dunfermline and Celtic.

References

External links 

1967 births
Living people
Association football forwards
Scottish footballers
Dunfermline Athletic F.C. players
Walsall F.C. players
Cowdenbeath F.C. players
Clyde F.C. players
Albion Rovers F.C. players
Montrose F.C. players
Livingston F.C. players
Partick Thistle F.C. players
Scottish Football League players
English Football League players
Footballers from Dunfermline
Inverness Thistle F.C. players
Glenafton Athletic F.C. players
Kelty Hearts F.C. players